The 2018 Norrbil Swedish FIM Speedway Grand Prix was the fourth race of the 2018 Speedway Grand Prix season. It took place on July 7 at the HZ Bygg Arena in Hallstavik, Sweden.

Riders 
The Speedway Grand Prix Commission nominated Andreas Jonsson as the wild card, and Linus Sundström and Kim Nilsson both as Track Reserves.

Results 
The Grand Prix was won by Maciej Janowski, who beat Fredrik Lindgren, Bartosz Zmarzlik and Tai Woffinden in the final. Woffinden retained his overall world championship lead, in fact he extended it to 11 points after outscoring Lindgren by a point. Janowski moved up to fourth place, one point behind Emil Sayfutdinov.

Heat details

Intermediate classification

References 

2018
Sweden
2018 in Swedish motorsport
July 2018 sports events in Sweden